The 1991–92 NCAA Division III men's ice hockey season began in October 1991 and concluded on March 21 of the following year. This was the 19th season of Division III college ice hockey.

Regular season

Season tournaments

Standings

Note: Mini-game are not included in final standings

1992 NCAA Tournament

Note: * denotes overtime period(s)

See also
 1991–92 NCAA Division I men's ice hockey season

References

External links

 
NCAA